Kenneth Ilagan is a Filipino musician who was the guitarist for the rock band The Dawn. Before assuming guitar duties for The Dawn, Ilagan also played guitar for Violent Playground, True Faith and Xaga (who then became Rivermaya).

Ilagan is a cousin of The Pin-Ups front man Mondo C. Castro.

Ilagan now enjoys his time living in the San Francisco Bay Area.

References

Living people
Filipino rock guitarists
Year of birth missing (living people)